Ana Feio de Gama Alegria (born 11 March 1977) is a Portuguese swimmer. She competed at the 1992 Summer Olympics and the 1996 Summer Olympics.

References

External links
 

1977 births
Living people
Portuguese female swimmers
Olympic swimmers of Portugal
Swimmers at the 1992 Summer Olympics
Swimmers at the 1996 Summer Olympics
Sportspeople from Durban